Bangalore Venkatasubbiah Krishna Sastry was an Indian writer and music critic. He was born in Nanjangud in the State of Karnataka on 30 July 1916. He earned a diploma in painting from Chamarajendra Technical Institute in 1938. He died on 22 September 2003.

Awards
 Akashvani Annual Award (1976)
 Karnataka State Rajyotsava Award (1985)
 Karnataka Lalita Kala Academy Award (1986)
 The Music Academy's T.T.K. Award (1986)
 Karnataka Sangeeta Nrutya Academy Award (1988) 
 Sangeet Natak Akademi Award Overall contribution (1999–2000)

References
B.V.K. Sastry: Respected Writer, Scholar And Critic

1916 births
2003 deaths
Indian music critics
Writers from Karnataka
People from Mysore district
Recipients of the Sangeet Natak Akademi Award